Qalat District is a district of Zabul Province in southern Afghanistan. Its district seat is Qalat, the capital of the province.

Demographics 
It has a population of about 34,300 as of 2013. The district is mostly populated by the Hotak tribe of Ghilji Pashtuns.

See also 
 Districts of Afghanistan

References

External links 

Districts of Zabul Province